Dewa Mountains is a mountain range that runs north and south on the west side of the Tohoku region of Japan. The mountain range spans Aomori, Akita, and Yamagata prefectures. The highest peak of the mountain range is Mount Chokai (2,236m).

The range is the focal point for the Akinomine (秋の嶺 "peak of autumn") ritual, which is observed by the Mount Haguro lineage of Shugendō.

See also 
 Three Mountains of Dewa

References 

Mountain ranges of Aomori Prefecture
Mountain ranges of Akita Prefecture
Mountain ranges of Yamagata Prefecture